Paul Barthélemy Mirabaud (29 June 1848 – 12 May 1908) was a French banker and philatelist from Versailles, Yvelines who was a specialist in the stamps of Switzerland.

In 1921, he was one of the "Fathers of Philately" entered on the Roll of Distinguished Philatelists. Together with Swedish-born Baron Axel de Reuterskiöld he wrote Les Timbres Postes de la Suisse 1843-1860 which was published in 1899. The book is considered well-researched and the first published deep study of Swiss philately. The book is still considered a standard reference and has been the basis for many more modern or more particular enquiries into the field of the Swiss classical issues.

References

1848 births
1908 deaths
French bankers
French philatelists
Philately of Switzerland
Regents of the Banque de France
Fathers of philately
People from Versailles